Dwight B. La Du (April 27, 1876 Van Buren, Onondaga County, New York – August 17, 1954) was an American civil engineer and politician from New York. He was New York State Engineer and Surveyor from 1923 to 1924.

Biography
He was born on April 27, 1876 to J. Sears La Du and Julia L. (Warner) La Du.

He was Division Engineer of the Eastern Division of the State Canals under John A. Bensel, and in 1914 was appointed Special Deputy State Engineer, a post he retained under Frank M. Williams. He resigned in the fall of 1918, and ran for State Engineer and Surveyor on the Democratic ticket in November 1918, but was defeated by Williams. In 1922, he ran again, and was elected, being in office from 1923 to 1924, but was defeated again for re-election in 1924 by Republican Roy G. Finch.

He died on August 17, 1954 in Albany, New York.

References

Further reading
 Campaign expenses filed, in NYT on November 16, 1918
 Election results, in NYT on December 8, 1922
Du+1876&dq=dwight+b+La Du+1876&hl=pt-BR&pgis=1 Manual for the Use of the Legislature of the State of New York issued by the New York Dept. of State (1950)
Du+1876&hl=pt-BR American Biographical Index by Laureen Baillie (K.G. Saur, 2007)
Du+appointed&hl=pt-BR&sig=ACfU3U0l8D_GX6PTS8yaoXFtM-pZPUuW4Q History of the Barge Canal of New York State by Noble E. Whitford (pages 450ff; READ BOOKS, 2007)

1876 births
1954 deaths
New York State Engineers and Surveyors
American civil engineers
People from Van Buren, New York
Missing middle or first names
New York (state) Democrats